The Queenstown Trail is a cycle and walking trail funded as one of the projects of the New Zealand Cycle Trail (NZCT) system in Otago, New Zealand. It links the towns of Queenstown, Arrowtown, the suburb of Jack's Point and the area of Gibbston. It is at least 110 km in length but is not linear and instead follows the terrain often near rivers and lakes to link key places in a series of tracks that also access public land. In some places it also passes through private land such as working farms and users are encouraged to stay on the trail.
The trail is a joint venture between the Government, Queenstown Lakes District Council and the Queenstown Trails Trust.

Routes 
Popular routes are listed below and can be started and finished in either direction:

Frankton Track & Kelvin Peninsula Trail 

Links the locations of Queenstown and Kelvin Peninsula. This track surrounds the Frankton Arm section of Lake Wakatipu. Initially the track starts close to the Queenstown Gardens and then runs parallel to Frankton Road near the lake edge and then passes through Frankton before going over the Kawarau Falls Bridge near . The track ends at the Kelvin Heights suburb on the Peninsula, but can be continued on if desired.

Jack's Point Trail 
Connects the area of Kelvin Heights part of the Kelvin Peninsula to Jack's Point.
Starts near the Queenstown Golf Club on the Kelvin Heights Peninsula 
Views are wide open across Lake Wakatipu towards mountains such as Cecil Peak and Lake Wakatipu.

Countryside Trail 
Links the locations of Queenstown and Arrowtown via Frankton. Passes over the old Lower Shotover Bridge which is above the Shotover River.

Lake Hayes Trail 

This is a route that encircles Lake Hayes. There are various points it can be started from including the Lake Hayes Pavilion next to State Highway 6 and the Picnic area at the north of the lake accessed via Arrowtown Road and also Rutherford Road (off Speargrass Flat Road). Was originally called the Lake Hayes Loop then the Lake Hayes Circuit but currently referred to as the Lake Hayes Trail. This track connects to the nearby Lake Hayes Estate residential sub-division.

Twin Rivers Trail 
A route that links Frankton with the Lake Hayes area but also joins onto the Arrow River Bridges Ride. Passes both the Kawarau and Shotover Rivers and hence the name. Also goes past the suburb of Lake Hayes Estate and there is a track that can take you to the Lake Hayes Loop. Originally called the Twin River Ride it was changed to Twin Rivers Trail to reflect the diverse mix of users.

Arrow River Bridges Trail 

This route connects Arrowtown to Gibbston. For much of its length follows the Arrow River. It can end at Chard Farm or can be linked onto the Gibbston River Trail. This trail contains many of the bridges that can be passed over on the Queenstown Trail as well as The Barfoot Tunnel. Originally called the Arrow River Bridges Ride it was changed to the Arrow River Bridges Trail to reflect the diverse mix of users.

Gibbston River Trail 

A route that passes along the Kawarau River around many vineyards in the Gibbston Valley. Carparks are available at each end of the track. There are also several loops in the track allowing for a varied or shorter route. This track was managed by Department of Conservation track until its upgrade in 2014 making it bike friendly and becoming officially part of the Queenstown Trail.

History 
Originally the name for the network of trails in the region was the Wakatipu Trails before being renamed The Queenstown Trail.
Signage on the trail simply calls it Queenstown Trail.
The Wakatipu Trails Trust was set up in 2002 after a meeting between Duncan Field of QLDC and Chris Eden the DOC Wakatipu Area Manager at the time to assess the interest in created a network of recreational trails. In 2004 the Wakatipu Trails strategy was developed which helped to guide the development of the trails. 
The main routes of the Queenstown Trail now link up with many smaller tracks not part of the official trail many of which existed before its 2012 opening.

Opening 
The trail was opened on 18 October 2012 although many parts of the trail had already been constructed and were in regular use by the public before this date. It was officially opened by the Prime Minister John Key and cyclist Sarah Ulmer near Arrowtown.
It had taken 3 years and more than 100 contractors costing $5.4 million (NZD) to build.

Hazards 
Several places of the trail have drop offs sometimes near rivers, occasionally bad weather can cause slips to occur which can temporarily close parts of the track.  Although nearly the entire track is off-road a small number of sections cross either roads or driveways. There is also the potential for collisions between different users since they are travelling at different speeds and directions and there are quite a few blind corners.

Structures 
As part of the Queenstown Trail there are three existing bridges (built before the trail was conceived) and six new structures (two wooden bridges, two suspension bridges, an underbridge and a tunnel). The bridges and tunnel built specifically for the Queenstown Trail were named after families that made significant donations towards the project.

Pre-existing structures
 Lower Shotover Bridge: This is a restored historic bridge that used to be used for traffic but is now used by cyclists and pedestrians.
 Kawarau Falls Bridge: Originally this old bridge had space for pedestrians on one side and an alternating one way section for traffic. In 2018 a traffic bridge was built nearby and the Kawarau Falls Bridge became a pedestrian only bridge.

 Kawarau Gorge Suspension Bridge: This is the bridge used by the AJ Hackett Bungy Company.

Structures built for the Trail
In order to transverse sections of the trail that crossed rivers or roads these structures were built for trail users and funded by supporters:
 The Edgar Bridge: This is an 80 metre suspension bridge over the Arrow Gorge and named after Sir Eion and Lady Edgar.
 The Barfoot Tunnel: The Barfoot Tunnel, under State Highway 6, was made possible by a donation from Garth and Judy Barfoot, of Auckland.
 The Knights Family Bridge: Named after the family that made a donation for the under bridge that goes beneath State Highway 6.
 The Southern Discoveries Bridge: A second suspension bridge that goes over the Arrow River near to where the opening ceremony was held.
 The Swain Bridge: The Swain Bridge is to be found on the Arrowtown Millennium Trail. Named after Ken Swain a Queenstown Trails Trust trustee.
 Billie’s Bridge: This is a mini bridge that runs over Hayes Creek (the outflow of Lake Hayes which flows into the Kawarau River) and is named after a member of the Sargood family.

References

External links

The Official Queenstown Trail Site
Cycle Trails New Zealand  (New Zealand Trails website for local and international tourism)
News video of the opening of the trail (From One News at tvnz.co.nz)
Lower Shotover Bridge engineering

New Zealand Cycle Trail
Tourist attractions in Otago
Sport in Queenstown, New Zealand
Queenstown-Lakes District
Sport in Otago